Cork South was a parliamentary constituency represented in Dáil Éireann, the lower house of the Irish parliament or Oireachtas from 1948 to 1961. The constituency elected 3 deputies (Teachtaí Dála, commonly known as TDs) to the Dáil, on the system of proportional representation by means of the single transferable vote (PR-STV).

History 
The constituency was created under the Electoral (Amendment) Act 1947, for the 1948 general election to Dáil Éireann. It succeeded the constituency of Cork South-East. It was abolished under the Electoral (Amendment) Act 1961, when it was partially replaced by the new constituency of Cork South-West.

Boundaries 
The administrative county of Cork except the portion thereof which was comprised in the constituencies of Cork Borough, Cork North, Cork East and Cork West.

TDs

Elections

1957 general election

1954 general election

1951 general election

1948 general election

See also 
Dáil constituencies
Politics of the Republic of Ireland
Historic Dáil constituencies
Elections in the Republic of Ireland

References

External links
Oireachtas Members Database

Dáil constituencies in the Republic of Ireland (historic)
Historic constituencies in County Cork
1948 establishments in Ireland
1961 disestablishments in Ireland
Constituencies established in 1948
Constituencies disestablished in 1961